Edwin Charles Krupp (born November 18, 1944) is an American astronomer, researcher, author, and popularizer of science. He is an internationally recognized expert in the field of archaeoastronomy, the study of how ancient cultures viewed the sky and how those views affected their cultures.  He has taught at the college level, as a planetarium lecturer, and in various documentary films.  He has been the director of the Griffith Observatory in Los Angeles since first taking over the position in 1974 after the departure of the previous director, William J. Kaufmann III. His writings include science papers and journal articles, astronomy magazine articles, books on astronomy and archaeoastronomy for adults, and books explaining sky phenomena and astronomy to children.

Krupp is a member of the American Astronomical Society and the International Astronomical Union, and has served in several divisions and commissions of both organizations.  He is also a fellow of the Committee for Skeptical Inquiry and a member of that organization's Council for Media Integrity.

Early life 
Edwin Charles Krupp was born in Chicago, Illinois, on November 18, 1944 where as a child his parents took him to many of the local museums. In 1956 the family moved to Los Angeles where Krupp's father, a mechanical engineer, worked on the Apollo program and then on the Space Shuttle.

Education 
In 1961 Krupp attended the Summer Science Program (SSP). Among other things, SSP teaches astronomy to high school students. Krupp has remained active with SSP, first as a graduate student teaching assistant from 1968 to 1972 and later as a frequent guest lecturer.  Krupp has said of SSP, 

Krupp studied physics and astronomy at Pomona College (the founding member of the Claremont Colleges consortium) in Claremont, California.  His undergraduate advisor was Robert J. Chambers.  While studying at Pomona College, Krupp participated in cross-country, track, and soccer. He also worked at KSPC, the Pomona College non-commercial community radio station. He lived for two years at the Brackett Observatory, during this time he served as caretaker of the observatory, weatherman, and telescope demonstrator.  He received a Bachelor of Arts degree in 1966.

Krupp pursued graduate studies in astronomy at the University of California, Los Angeles (UCLA), receiving a Master of Arts degree in 1968  and PhD in 1972. His Ph.D. dissertation concerned the morphology of rich clusters of galaxies.  His graduate adviser was George O. Abell.

Career

Teaching 
Krupp began his teaching career as a teaching assistant for the Summer Science Program during his graduate school days.  Also, during graduate school he taught at the following education institutions:
 El Camino College
 University of Southern California
 University of California, Los Angeles

He became a planetarium lecturer at Griffith Observatory while also still in graduate school.  Krupp has been a frequent lecturer throughout his career.  He has lectured on science based tours he has led and other venues.

Griffith Observatory 

Krupp took his first job at Griffith Observatory in Los Angeles while he was still a doctoral candidate at UCLA.  This was as a part-time planetarium lecturer and Krupp did not enjoy this job at first, saying to his wife Robin, "Gee this isn't science, It's showbusiness." But, after he started noticing the audiences responding with increasing enthusiasm he started saying, "Hey, this is showbusiness."

Krupp was appointed Observatory Curator in 1972 upon completion of his PhD.  In 1974 the director of Griffith Observatory, William J. Kaufmann III, left, and Krupp was appointed acting director. In 1976 Krupp's title was changed from "acting" director to director.

As early as 1978 Krupp was aware that the observatory would need a future restoration and that there was a need to update equipment and exhibits. So he and Harold and Debra Griffith co-founded the Friends of the Observatory (FOTO).  FOTO aids the mission of the observatory in many ways.  FOTO partnered with the city to renovate and expand the observatory raising US$30 million for the effort ($26 million in private funds).  The observatory closed its doors in 2002 for the $93 Million dollar renovation and expansion.  The entire project was spearheaded by Krupp, and the observatory reopened in the fall of 2006.

Krupp often appears in the media to discuss and explain developments and recent discoveries in astronomy, as well as discuss current celestial events.

In 2014 Griffith Observatory had its 80th anniversary and Krupp his 40th as observatory director.  At that time, John Ashton of Sunseeker Tours in Long Beach noted, "It's an L.A. treasure.  We get more requests to see this than anything."  And, then LA City Councilman Tom LaBonge (whose district included the observatory) observed:

Archaeoastronomy 

Krupp has a special interest in the impact of astronomy on ancient belief systems, and is an internationally recognized expert on traditional astronomies.  He is noted for his many contributions to the field on which he has written extensively, and he has visited, and studied, nearly 2,000 prehistoric, and historic sites around the world.

Krupp has traveled around the world for his archaeoastronomy studies. These trips have also taken him to sites close to home such as the Burro Flats pictograph site in the Simi Hills of Southern California, which he first visited in 1979.  Over the years, Krupp has made semi-regular trips to that site to conduct solstice observations.

Krupp has shared his studies of archaeoastronomy with the general public by including archaeoastronomy topics in Griffith Observatory planetarium programs, writing books and magazine articles, appearing in documentary films, and leading tours to archaeological sites that are associated with ancient astronomy.

Bibliography 
Krupp has written several books for adults and for children.  His first two adult books (one being his doctoral dissertation), both derive from the work he did on rich clusters of galaxies while a PhD student at UCLA.  His remaining adult books derive from his interests in archaeoastronomy, and contain extensive original research and analysis, while also being educational in nature.  They cover astronomy in ancient cultures and the effect of beliefs about the sky on those cultures.

Books for adults 
Books authored, partially authored, and/or edited by Krupp for an adult audience:

Chapters, forewords, and research papers 
Krupp has also written full chapters for books edited by other authors, as well as research papers, included in publications of the proceedings of conferences where the papers were presented. Here are some examples

 Time and astronomy at the meeting of two worlds : proceedings of the International Symposium held in April 27 – May, 1992 in Frombork, Poland edited by Stanislaw Iwaniszewski
 California Girls: Pleiades Traditions in Native California
 Handbook of Archaeoastronomy and Ethnoastronomy edited by Clive Ruggles, Krupp wrote three chapters for this book:
 In Part I, Themes and Issues
 Chapter 5, Astronomy and power
 Chapter 18, Archaeoastronomy concepts in popular culture
 In Part III, Pre-Columbian and indigenous North America
 Chapter 41, Rock Art of the greater southwest
 Cosmology, Calendars, and Horizon-based Astronomy in Ancient Mesoamerica, edited by  Anne S. DoudSusan Milbrath
 Krupp wrote the Foreword for this book,
 Astronomy, Anthropology, and Anthony Aveni
 Krupp has contributed to two books on the work of artist of James Turrell,
 Mapping Spaces : a topological survey of the work by James Turrell
 Authors: Craig Adcock, E C Krupp, Mario Diacono, James Turrell
 James Turrell: A Retrospective
 Authors: Michael Govan, James Turrell, Florian Holzherr, Christine Kim, Carol S Eliel, Alison Lima Greene, E C Krupp, Vivian Sobchack

Books for children 
Children themed books, with illustrations by Robin Rector Krupp:

Magazine/journal articles 
Krupp was once a contributing editor to Sky & Telescope magazine and had a monthly column in that publication.  The column was named Rambling Through the Skies and discussed the impact of astronomy on culture.  He has also served as the editor of the Griffith Observer, the monthly magazine published by Griffith Observatory's.

Krupp has written many articles on astronomy and culture for the general reader and dozens of research papers.  This list is a mere sampling:

Films 
Krupp has appeared in several documentary films and educational film series.  He also has writing credits and scientific advisor credits.  These include:

Planetarium programs 
Krupp started his career at Griffith Observatory as a planetarium lecturer.  As directory of the observatory he has returned to the Samuel Oschin Planetarium at Griffith Observatory as a writer.  He has several planetarium show writing credits.

Professional affiliations 
Krupp is affiliated with several scientific, astronomical, archaeoastronomical, and educational organizations.

 American Astronomical Society, and its Historical Astronomy Division
 Historical Astronomy Division Vice-Chairman 1983–1985, Chairman 1985–1987
 International Astronomical Union
 Member of
 Division C Education, Outreach and Heritage
 Commission C3 History of Astronomy
 Inter-Commission C3-C4 WG Archaeoastronomy and Astronomy in Culture
 Past Member of
 Division XII Union-Wide Activities (until 2012)
 Commission 41 History of Astronomy (until 2015)
 Commission 46 Astronomy Education & Development (until 2015)
 Commission 41 WG Archaeoastronomy and Astronomy in Culture (2015–2015)
 Commission 41 WG Astronomy and World Heritage (until 2015)
 Committee for Skeptical Inquiry 
 Fellow
 Member of Council for Media Integrity

Awards and honors 
Krupp's writings, and active evangelization of the universe to the public, has resulted in his receiving several awards and honors:

On November 22, 2013 Krupp was presented with the Andrew Gemant Award at a session of the Los Angeles city council, the award citation indicated that Krupp was being recognized for:
 40 years of outreach and education through extraordinary planetarium shows and programs.
 Award-winning and popular articles, books, exhibits, lectures, public events and television programs.
 Distinguished archaeoastronomical research in which the links between astronomy and ancient culture have been explored.

At the ceremony Catherine O'Riordan, then AIP vice president of Physics Resources said:

Personal life 
Krupp married Robin Rector on New Year's Eve of 1968. They had one son and divorced in 2006. Krupp now resides in the Eagle Rock neighborhood of Los Angeles, California.

Notes

References

External links
 
 

Krupp
American astronomers
Archaeoastronomers
Historians of astronomy
20th-century American scientists
21st-century American scientists
Scientists from California
University of California, Los Angeles alumni
Writers from Chicago
1944 births
Living people
Summer Science Program
American skeptics
Pomona College alumni